Adai may refer to:

 Adai people
Adai language
 A type of dosa, a South Indian crêpe
 A minor Kazakh Jüz "horde", numbering ca. 80–90,000
 Adai Khan, Mongol khan of Northern Yuan Dynasty
 Adai, FATA, a town in the Federally Administered Areas of Pakistan

Language and nationality disambiguation pages